Omniva is an international post and logistics company based in Tallinn, Estonia, that targets the Baltic states. The name Omniva was adopted in June 2014; the company was previously called AS Eesti Post, whose history can be traced back to the beginning of postal services on Estonian territory (at that time part of the Swedish Empire) in 1638.

In August 2011, the service network included 398 post offices. As of November 2021, that had declined to 265 post offices, of which 187 were located in rural areas. 

As of June 2014, Omniva is responsible for services that have been known by other names, such as Post24 automatic parcel machines, ELS courier service, Kirjakeskus mail centre and eArvekeskus e-invoicing centre. Omniva retains the name Eesti Post for the division of the company responsible for the national postal service of Estonia.

Eesti Post offers postal, logistics and infologistics services, including international and domestic courier services. Through its service network, the company cooperates with other companies in other services, such as banks (SEB), loan companies (Credit24) and money remittance companies (Western Union).

Omniva Group also includes subsidiaries such as AS Eesti Elektronpost, in which AS Eesti Post holds 50.86%, and Eesti E-arvete Keskus OÜ, which started operations on 3 June 2009. AS Eesti Elektronpost in turn owns part of the Kazakh company Elektronpost.

Omniva is a member of PostEurop (1994), the Estonian Information Technology and Telecommunications Union and the Baltic Postal Union (1994).

History 
As a successor to the state postal service, Eesti Post began in 1636. It preceded the Swedish national postal system established in 1638, which was introduced in Estonia and Livonia in 1638 on the basis of the postal decree of Queen Kristiina's guardianship government. 

Before 1917, 157 post offices operated in the territory of the Republic of Estonia, in addition to three independent state telephone exchanges.

On 25 February 1918, the German occupation authorities took over the Tallinn post office and liquidated the existing postal system. 

The first Estonian stamps appeared on sale on 22 November 1918, which showed a flower pattern (5 kopecks) and on November 30, another flower pattern (15 kopecks).

In 2009, Eesti Post issued a commemorative stamp to mark the 90th anniversary of Julius Kuperjanov's death. In the same year, they issued another stamp to honor General Laidoner's 125 birthday.

See also
SmartPost
PostEurop

Notes

External links

Article on PostAndParcel.info

Communications in Estonia
Logistics companies of Estonia
Estonia
Companies based in Tallinn
Postal system of Estonia
Government-owned companies of Estonia